Ciaran Jenkins (born 1984, in Merthyr Tydfil, Wales) is a Welsh journalist and reporter who works for Channel 4 News, the flagship news programme of British broadcaster Channel 4. He is the channel's Scotland correspondent.

Personal life
Jenkins was born in Merthyr Tydfil, a former mining town in the valleys of South Wales. His father is the Welsh poet and author, Mike Jenkins. His sister is Bethan Jenkins, a Plaid Cymru politician who represented the South Wales West region in the National Assembly for Wales. He also has a younger sister named Niamh.

He read Music at Fitzwilliam College, Cambridge, graduating in 2005 and was a gifted cellist, reaching the final of the Texaco Young Musician of Wales competition in 1999. In 2016, Jenkins shared his experience of studying at Cambridge as an ambassador for the Seren Network.

Career
After leaving university, Jenkins lived in Japan where he studied Japanese and wrote articles for The Guardian newspaper's Comment is Free website. He studied at Cardiff University School of Journalism during which time he developed a popular political blog, Blamerbell Briefs.

Jenkins is a former BBC Cymru Wales education correspondent, appearing frequently on BBC Wales Today and the Welsh language news programme, Newyddion.

He conducted in-depth investigations into bogus academics and fraud in 2011, which led to the effective abolition of the University of Wales, formerly Britain's second-largest university.

Jenkins joined Channel 4 News as a reporter in January 2012.

Awards

Jenkins was named Royal Television Society Young Journalist of the Year 2012 for his work on Channel 4 News.

Jenkins also won the Current Affairs category at the Celtic Media Awards 2012 for his investigation, Cash for Qualifications, which exposed potential visa and exam fraud at the University of Wales.

His earlier investigation, University Challenged,
won Best News, Current Affairs & Sport programme at BAFTA Wales in 2011.

Jenkins won Grand Prize at the inaugural CNN European News Blog Awards in 2006 for his political blog Blamerbell Briefs.

References

1984 births
Alumni of Fitzwilliam College, Cambridge
Welsh journalists
British reporters and correspondents
Living people
People from Merthyr Tydfil
BBC newsreaders and journalists
ITN newsreaders and journalists